Desi Oakley, (born June 12, 1989), is an American singer and actress, known for her work in musical theatre. She has performed in shows such as Waitress, Chicago, and Wicked.

Early life and education
Desiree or "Desi" Oakley was born in Wichita, Kansas. She was first exposed to professional theatre at Music Theatre Wichita and began performing at the age of 8 years. Some of her early roles included Dorothy Gale in The Wizard of Oz, Eponine in Les Misérables, Gabriella in High School Musical, and Ariel in The Little Mermaid. She graduated, BFA in Musical Theater, from the University of Michigan in 2011.

Broadway career
Oakley made her Broadway debut in Wicked at the Gershwin Theatre on January 3, 2012, as one of the show's swings. She was later cast as a member of the ensemble and understudied the roles of Elphaba and Nessarose Thropp.

After her work on Wicked, Oakley went on to appear in the 2012 Broadway revival of Annie at the Palace Theatre. In addition to her role in the ensemble, she understudied both Grace Farrell and Lily St. Regis. Soon after this, Oakley joined the National Tour of the 2012 revival of Evita, serving as the alternate for the titular role and performing twice per week.

In 2016, Oakley joined the cast of the 2014 Broadway revival of Les Misérables at the Imperial Theatre. She served as a member of the ensemble and covered the role of Fantine. Oakley stayed with the production until its final performance on September 4, 2016.

Oakley is best known for her performance in the lead role of Jenna in Waitress, where she originated on the show's first National Tour. Along with this, she temporarily starred as Jenna in the West End production of Waitress, at the Adelphi Theatre, in January 2020.

On May 13, 2019, Oakley began starring as Roxie Hart in Chicago on Broadway. She played three two-week engagements in the role, with her final performance on July 28, 2019. Her latest album "THE LIGHT EFFECT" released in June 2022 as a Broadway show, starring Caitlin Kinnunen, Erika Henningsen & Christiani Pitts.

Other works

Along with performing on Broadway, Oakley is also a singer-songwriter. She has released several independent studio albums. Her releases include 2014's Don't Look Back and 2019's Repeat. In 2020, Oakley released A Pocket of Time, donating the proceeds from digital downloads to the Dramatist Guild Foundation in support of struggling artists during the COVID-19 pandemic. She has also recorded several one-off singles including White Butterfly and 2020 Winter Song (featuring Becca White).

Oakley also has taught at various Musical Theater intensives, teaching classes both in New York City and across the country. In November 2019 along with her Evita tour castmate and friend Krystina Alabado, she launched Pop Rock Broadway: a Broadway training program for young actors in NYC expanding into the world of Pop, Rock, and Contemporary Musical Theatre.

References

1989 births
Living people
American musical theatre actresses
21st-century American actresses
University of Michigan alumni